Statistics of Eastern Professional Soccer Conference in season 1964/1965.

League standings
                           G   W   T   L   GF  GA  PTS
     North Division
 BW Gottschee              16   9   1   6   27  22  19
 German-Hungarians         14   8   2   4   37  27  18
 Giuliana                  15   6   5   4   31  26  17
 New York Hungaria         15   7   3   5   34  29  17
 Boston Metros             13   5   3   5   24  21  13
 Newark Ukrainians         15   1   2  12   13  42   4

     South Division
 New York Ukrainians       15   9   3   3   33  12  21
 New York Inter            16   8   5   3   31  28  21
 Ukrainian Nationals       14   7   5   2   30  14  19
 New York Hota             15   6   5   4   21  17  17
 New York Americans        16   4   4   8   21  34  12
 Greek-Americans           13   3   3   7   21  30   9
 Minerva-Pfuelzer          17   3   1  13   15  36   7

References
EASTERN PROFESSIONAL SOCCER CONFERENCE (RSSSF)

Eastern